Elusa affinis is a species of moth of the family Noctuidae. It was described by Walter Rothschild in 1915 and is known from New Guinea.

References

Moths described in 1915
Hadeninae
Moths of New Guinea